Jay Alexander Clarke (born 27 July 1998) is a British tennis player.
In 2017, on a Wimbledon wildcard, Clarke and Marcus Willis beat the defending doubles champions and second seeds, Nicolas Mahut and Pierre-Hugues Herbert, in five sets, to progress to the third round.
Clarke has won four Futures titles and three Challenger titles.

Early and personal life

Clarke is from Pear Tree, Derby.  He is of Jamaican-British descent. Clarke grew up in a tennis-oriented family with his two sisters and brother also playing tennis. He attributes his love of tennis to his father Earol who also coached him and his siblings. Clarke’s older sister Yasmin (former 532 WTA) is a big part of his team.

Junior career

2012
Playing in the Great Britain Under 14 boys team, with Samuel Ferguson, they won the European Winter Cup defeating Sweden in the final.

Clarke won two Tennis Europe 14U Grade 1 events to become the 14U No.1 in Europe. Consequently, Clarke gained the May AEGON Junior Player of the Month Award.

2015
Clarke was the no 1 ranked British junior, living and training in Stockholm.

Senior career

2016–2017
Clarke has risen from an ATP singles ranking of No. 1,621 in the world in June 2016 to a career high of No. 219 achieved on 4 December 2017. He trained with Andy Murray before the French Open and travelled with the Great Britain Davis Cup team for their tie against France.

Clarke received a singles wild card for the 2017 Wimbledon qualifiers but lost in the final round. Clarke was awarded a wildcard to the doubles main draw with Marcus Willis, where they reached the third round after upsetting the defending champions and second seeds Nicolas Mahut and Pierre-Hugues Herbert in a five-setter.

2018
Clarke made his ATP main draw debut at the Queen's Club Championships where he was given a wildcard into the singles event, he lost in straight sets to the American fifth seed Sam Querrey. Clarke was awarded a wild card to the main draw of the 2018 Wimbledon Championship for his grand slam singles debut. Clarke reached the semi-finals in the mixed doubles with Harriet Dart beating the first seeds in the third round.

ATP Challengers and ITF Futures finals

Singles: 13 (7 titles, 6 runner-ups)

Doubles: 3 (1 title, 2 runner-ups)

References

External links

1998 births
Living people
Sportspeople from Derby
English male tennis players
British male tennis players
Tennis people from Derbyshire